Benjamin Gregory (born 21 November 1990) is a British decathlete.

In the 2014 Commonwealth Games he represented Wales and placed sixth.

External links
 

1990 births
Living people
British decathletes
English decathletes
British male athletes
Commonwealth Games competitors for Wales
Athletes (track and field) at the 2014 Commonwealth Games
Place of birth missing (living people)